Abad (also Romanized as Ābād) is a city in the Central District of Tangestan County, Bushehr province, Iran. At the 2006 census, its population was 3,197 in 737 households, when it was a village in Ahram Rural District. The following census in 2011 counted 3,503 people in 936 households, by which time the village had risen to the status of a city. The latest census in 2016 showed a population of 3,787 people in 1,078 households.

References 

Cities in Bushehr Province
Populated places in Tangestan County